The NXT North American Championship is a professional wrestling championship created and promoted by the American promotion WWE. It is primarily defended as the secondary men's championship of the NXT brand division, the promotion's developmental territory. The current champion is Wes Lee, who is in his first reign. 

The championship was introduced during the March 7, 2018, tapings of NXT (aired March 28) and the inaugural champion was Adam Cole. At the time, NXT was still regarded as a developmental territory for WWE. In September 2019, the company began promoting NXT as its "third brand" when the NXT television program was moved to the USA Network. Two years later, however, NXT reverted to its original function as WWE's developmental brand. In January 2022, the NXT Cruiserweight Championship was unified into the North American Championship.

The title is distinct from the WWF North American Heavyweight Championship, as it does not carry the lineage of the former title, which was contested from 1979 to 1981.

History 

In June 2012, WWE established NXT as their developmental territory, replacing Florida Championship Wrestling (FCW). It was not until 2018, however, that a secondary championship was established for the brand. During the March 7, 2018, tapings of NXT (aired March 28), NXT General Manager William Regal announced a ladder match for TakeOver: New Orleans to determine the inaugural NXT North American Champion. Later that night, EC3, Killian Dain, Adam Cole, Ricochet, Lars Sullivan, and Velveteen Dream were announced as the participants in the match. At the event, Cole won the match to become the inaugural champion.

While NXT had originally been established as WWE's developmental territory, the NXT North American Championship was introduced in the midst of NXT establishing itself as WWE's third major brand. This became official when NXT was moved to the USA Network in September 2019, thus making the NXT North American Championship a third secondary title for WWE, along with the WWE Intercontinental Championship and WWE United States Championship. In September 2021, however, NXT reverted to being WWE's developmental brand.

In January 2022, the NXT Cruiserweight Championship was unified into the North American Championship. At the special New Year's Evil episode of NXT 2.0 on January 4, 2022, reigning North American Champion Carmelo Hayes defeated Cruiserweight Champion Roderick Strong. The Cruiserweight Championship was retired with Hayes going forward as North American Champion.

The title was defended on the main roster for the first time when champion Solo Sikoa, who had been promoted to SmackDown shortly before winning the title, defended it on the September 16, 2022, episode of SmackDown against Madcap Moss.

Belt design
The championship belt was unveiled by WWE executive and NXT head Triple H on April 3, 2018. Featuring three gold plates on a thick brown leather strap, the rounded center plate features a globe that only shows the continent of North America. The banner above the globe reads "North American" and above the banner is the NXT logo. The lower banner at the bottom of the globe reads "Champion". In what has become a prominent feature of WWE's championship belts, the two side plates feature a removable center section which can be customized with the champion's logos; the default side plates feature a vertical NXT logo on a globe. This was WWE's first secondary title to feature customizable side plates. It was the only NXT championship to feature the NXT logo for the default side plates until the introduction of the NXT Women's Tag Team Championship in 2021; the other NXT championships feature the WWE logo.

Reigns 

The inaugural champion was Adam Cole. Velveteen Dream has the longest reign as champion at 231 days (209 days as recognized by WWE due to tape delay, but still the longest). Johnny Gargano has the most reigns at three, with his first reign being the shortest at 4 days (due to tape delay, however, WWE recognizes that Gargano's first reign lasted 25 days, thus recognizing Solo Sikoa's reign as the shortest at 7 days). Dream is the youngest champion at 23 years old while Damian Priest is the oldest at 37.

Wes Lee is the current champion in his first reign. He defeated Carmelo Hayes, Oro Mensah, Nathan Frazer and Von Wagner in a five-man ladder match  on October 22, 2022 in Orlando, Florida at Halloween Havoc.

Notes

References

External links 
 Official NXT North American Championship Title History

WWE NXT championships
North American professional wrestling championships